Kisarua is a village in Jagat block, Budaun district, Uttar Pradesh, India. Its village code is 128359. Budaun railway station is 9 KM away from the village. The village is administrated by Gram Panchayat.

References

Villages in Budaun district